MS Star is a fast Ro-Pax ferry operated by the Estonian ferry company Tallink. She was built at Aker Finnyards Helsinki Shipyard, Finland and entered service on Tallink's Helsinki–Tallinn service on 12 April 2007.

Star was the first fast ferry capable of around-the-year service used on the Helsinki–Tallinn route. The ship's design is heavily based on that of MS SeaFrance Rodin, built by Aker Finnyards for SeaFrance in 2001. The green external livery of the ship is according to Tallink promotion material "meant to reflect the environmentally friendly aspects of the ship's design".

Star has three daily departures from both Helsinki and Tallinn, with one crossing taking two hours. In Tallink marketing, Star has often been referred to as "Tallink Star". The ship's planned original delivery date was 5 April 2007, but this was postponed until 12 April 2007, owing to problems with the main engines.

During the COVID-19 outbreak crisis the ship was assigned to a government emergency service between Paldiski, Estonia, and Sassnitz, Germany to ease the transportation of goods between Estonia and Central Europe. Poland had closed its borders and required health declarations from truck drivers which introduced long truck queues on its borders and slowed transportation.

References

External links

 Tallink official website for Star
  Fakta om Fartyg: M/S Star (2007)
 Star at marinetraffic.com

Ferries of Estonia
Ships built in Helsinki
Cruiseferries
2006 ships